Frieda Inescort (born Frieda Wrightman, 29 June 1901 – 26 February 1976) was a Scottish-born actress best known for creating the role of Sorel Bliss in Noël Coward's play Hay Fever on Broadway. She also played the shingled lady in John Galsworthy's 1927 Broadway production Escape and Caroline Bingley in the 1940 film of Jane Austen’s Pride and Prejudice.

Early years
Born in Edinburgh, Inescort was the daughter of Scots-born journalist John "Jock" Wrightman and actress Elaine Inescourt, who was of German and Polish descent. They married in 1896 but parted ways when their daughter was still a young child.

While she lived in Britain, Inescort wrote for a newspaper in London and worked as secretary to Lord Astor. (Another source says that she was secretary to Lady Astor.)

After going to the United States, she not only acted but also worked as associate editor of The Exporter's Encyclopedia.

Stage
Inescort's acting debut came in The Truth About Blayds (1922), which was presented at the Booth Theatre on Broadway. Her other Broadway credits include You and I (1923), The Woman on the Jury (1923), Windows (1923), The Fake (1924), Ariadne (1925), Hay Fever (1925), Love in a Mist (1926), Mozart (1926), Trelawny of the "Wells" (1927), Escape (1927-1928), Napi (1931), Company's Coming (1931), Springtime for Henry (1931-1932), When Ladies Meet (1933), False Dreams, Farewell (1934), Lady Jane (1934), Soldier's Wife (1944-1945), The Mermaids Singing (1945-1946) and You Never Can Tell (1948).

Film

Frieda Wrightman adopted her mother's surname as her professional name and moved to Hollywood and made her film debut in The Dark Angel (1935). Her other films include Mary of Scotland (1936), Give Me Your Heart (1936), “Beauty for the Asking  (1939), The Letter (1940), The Trial of Mary Dugan (1941), You'll Never Get Rich (1941) and A Place in the Sun (1951).

She appeared with Laurence Olivier and Greer Garson as the conniving Caroline Bingley in the 1940 film version of Pride and Prejudice. She had a leading role in Call It a Day, a 1937 film in which she appeared with Olivia de Havilland, Bonita Granville, Roland Young, and Ian Hunter. In 1955 Inescort appeared as Mrs. Lawrence in the movie Foxfire starring Jeff Chandler and Jane Russell. She appeared in one episode of Perry Mason as Hope Quentin in "The Case of the Jealous Journalist" (season 5, 1961).

Personal life
On 2 August 1961, she and her husband since 1926, Ben Ray Redman, dined out. Redman had been despondent for some time. Returning home before her, he went upstairs to bed. He then called Frieda, informing her that he was depressed over the state of the world and had taken 12 sedative pills. By the time the paramedics arrived, he had died, a suicide at the age of 65. He had been working as a writer for the Saturday Review and was involved in the translation of European classics into English.

Inescort had been diagnosed with multiple sclerosis in 1932. Her disease accelerated after her husband's death, and she was using a wheelchair by the mid-1960s. On 7 July 1964, her estranged mother, British actress Elaine Inescourt, died in Brighton, England, aged 87. Frieda worked as much as possible for the funding of multiple sclerosis research. She was often seen in the Hollywood area seated in her wheelchair, collecting donations outside supermarkets and in malls.

Death
Inescort died at the age of 74 at the Motion Picture Country Home at Woodland Hills, California from multiple sclerosis.

Partial filmography

 The Dark Angel (1935) as Ann West
 If You Could Only Cook (1935) as Evelyn Fletcher
 The Garden Murder Case (1936) as Mrs. Fenwicke-Ralston
 The King Steps Out (1936) as Princess Helena
 Mary of Scotland (1936) as Mary Beaton
 Hollywood Boulevard (1936) as Alice Winslow
 Give Me Your Heart (1936) as Rosamond Melford
 The Great O'Malley (1937) as Mrs. Phillips
 Call It a Day (1937) as Dorothy Hilton
 Another Dawn (1937) as Grace Roark
 Portia on Trial (1937) as Portia Merriman
 Woman Doctor (1939) as Dr. Judith Randall Graeme
 Beauty for the Asking (1939) as Flora Barton-Williams
 The Zero Hour (1939) as Linda Marsh
 Tarzan Finds a Son! (1939) as Mrs. August Lancing
 A Woman Is the Judge (1939) as Mary Cabot
 Convicted Woman (1940) as Attorney Mary Ellis
 Pride and Prejudice (1940) as Miss Bingley
 The Letter (1940) as Dorothy Joyce
 Father's Son (1941) as Ruth Emory
 The Trial of Mary Dugan (1941) as Mrs. Wayne
 Shadows on the Stairs (1941) as Mrs. Stella Armitage
 Sunny (1941) as Elizabeth Warren
 You'll Never Get Rich (1941) as Mrs. Julia Cortland
 Remember the Day (1941) as Mrs. Dewey Roberts
 The Courtship of Andy Hardy (1942) as Olivia Nesbit
 Sweater Girl (1942) as Mrs. Menard
 Street of Chance (1942) as Alma Diedrich
 It Comes Up Love (1943) as Portia Winthrop
 The Amazing Mrs. Holliday (1943) as Karen Holliday
 Mission to Moscow (1943) as Madame Molotov (uncredited)
 The Return of the Vampire (1943) as Lady Jane Ainsley
 Heavenly Days (1944) as Ettie Clark
 The Judge Steps Out (1948) as Evelyn Bailey
 The Underworld Story (1950) as Mrs. Eldridge
 A Place in the Sun (1951) as Mrs. Ann Vickers
 Never Wave at a WAC (1953) as Lily Mae Gorham
 Casanova's Big Night (1954) as Signora Di Gambetta
 Foxfire (1955) as Mrs. Lawrence
 Flame of the Islands (1956) as Evelyn Hammond
 The Eddy Duchin Story (1956) as Edith Wadsworth
 The She-Creature (1956) as Mrs. Chappel
 Darby's Rangers (1958) as Lady Hollister
 Senior Prom (1958) as Mrs. Sherridan
 Juke Box Rhythm (1959) as Aunt Margaret
 The Alligator People (1959) as Mrs. Lavinia Hawthorne, Henry's Wife
 The Crowded Sky (1960) as Mrs. Mitchell

References

External links

 
 
 Frieda Inescort images, Getty Images. 
 

1901 births
1976 deaths
Scottish editors
Scottish women editors
Scottish film actresses
Scottish stage actresses
Scottish people of German descent
Scottish people of Polish descent
Neurological disease deaths in California
Deaths from multiple sclerosis
Actresses from Edinburgh
20th-century Scottish actresses
British emigrants to the United States